Lapis was an Italian language feminist magazine based in Milan, Italy, with the subtitle percorsi della riflessione femminile (paths of female reflection in English). It was in circulation between 1987 and 1996.

History and profile
Lapis was launched in 1987, and the first issue appeared in November that year. The founder was a feminist theorist, Lea Melandri. The magazine was started to document the women's transversal reflections. 

The publisher of the magazine changed over time. A company in Milan, Faenza, was the publisher from June 1989. Then the magazine was published on a quarterly basis by a feminist publishing house, Tartaruga, in Milan from March 1993. Later the frequency of the magazine was switched to monthly. Lea Melandri was also the director of Lapis from its start to its closing in 1996.

Lapis covered a wide variety of topics from women in workforce to their contributions to cultural development. The last issue appeared in December 1996.

References

1987 establishments in Italy
1996 disestablishments in Italy
Defunct magazines published in Italy
Feminism in Italy
Feminist magazines
Italian-language magazines
Magazines established in 1987
Magazines disestablished in 1996
Magazines published in Milan
Monthly magazines published in Italy
Quarterly magazines published in Italy
Women's magazines published in Italy